The canton of Le Lude is an administrative division of the Sarthe department, northwestern France. Its borders were modified at the French canton reorganisation which came into effect in March 2015. Its seat is in Le Lude.

It consists of the following communes:
 
Aubigné-Racan
La Bruère-sur-Loir
Cérans-Foulletourte
La Chapelle-aux-Choux
Château-l'Hermitage
Chenu
Coulongé
La Fontaine-Saint-Martin
Luché-Pringé
Le Lude
Mansigné
Mayet
Oizé
Pontvallain
Requeil
Saint-Germain-d'Arcé
Saint-Jean-de-la-Motte
Sarcé
Savigné-sous-le-Lude
Vaas
Verneil-le-Chétif
Yvré-le-Pôlin

References

Cantons of Sarthe